East Royalty is a neighbourhood of the Canadian city of Charlottetown, Prince Edward Island.

East Royalty is located in the northeast portion of the city and occupies the eastern part of the township of Queens Royalty.

Originally a rural farming community, East Royalty became an incorporated village before being amalgamated into Charlottetown on April 1, 1995.

References 

Former community municipalities in Prince Edward Island
Neighbourhoods in Charlottetown
Populated places disestablished in 1995